Rowland Blennerhassett may refer to:

Sir Rowland Blennerhassett, 1st Baronet (1741–1821), Anglo-Irish lawyer 
Sir Rowland Blennerhassett, 4th Baronet (1839–1909), Anglo-Irish MP for Galway Borough 1865–1874 and Kerry 1880–1885
Rowland Ponsonby Blennerhassett (1850–1913), Irish MP for Kerry 1872–1885
Rowland Blennerhassett (priest) (1919–2009), Archdeacon of Tuam from 1956 to 1969

See also
Blennerhassett (disambiguation)